David Ronson is an Australian former professional rugby league footballer who played in the 1980s and 1990s. He played for Manly-Warringah and Balmain in the New South Wales Rugby League (NSWRL) competition.

Playing career
Ronson, a Belrose Eagles junior, made his first grade debut for Manly against Canterbury-Bankstown in Round 16 1985 at the Sydney Cricket Ground scoring a try during a 16–12 loss. Ronson went on to become a regular starter for Manly on the wing and played nearly every game in 1986.

Ronson played 24 games for Manly in 1987 as the club reached the grand final against the Canberra Raiders. Manly-Warringah went on to win the premiership 18-8 after leading for the entire game. Ronson played on the wing during the match. The grand final was also the last one to be played at the Sydney Cricket Ground.

Ronson remained as Manly's first choice winger until departing the club at the end of the 1991 season. After a 3-year absence in first grade, Ronson signed with Balmain and had a brief stint with the club playing in a few games.

References

1967 births
Living people
Australian rugby league players
Manly Warringah Sea Eagles players
Balmain Tigers players
Rugby league wingers
Rugby league centres
Rugby league players from Sydney